The Curtiss Model J (along with the Curtiss Model N) was a prototype tractor configuration aircraft that became the basis for the Curtiss Jenny series of aircraft.

Development
The Curtiss J was designed by Benjamin D. Thomas. Glenn Curtiss hired Thomas from the Sopwith Aviation Company while on a trip to London, England. He started designing the Model J while overseas, and is also credited with helping design the Model N and the Model H "America". The first flight tests were performed without fuselage covering. In February 1914, after a series of accidents with pusher aircraft, the U.S. Army held a meeting in San Diego expressing interest in tractor design aircraft such as the Model J

Design
The Model J had the engine mounted on the nose of the aircraft with a tractor propeller and was covered with clear doped linen or cotton, with tandem seating and conventional landing gear with a tailskid. The biplane wings were built without dihedral and the upper wing was considerably greater in span than the lower and fitted with ailerons. The Curtiss Model J S.C. No. 30 became the testing prototype for the JN, earning the title as the first "Jenny".

Operational history
The first prototype was rolled out on 12 March 1914. It was delivered to the Aviation Section, U.S. Signal Corps on 28 July. At the time the entire United States military air fleet consisted of 23 aircraft.

1914 In September, pilot Lewis E. Goodier, Jr. achieved a record climb rate for an aircraft of 1000 ft per minute. Later that month the Model J would become the fastest aircraft in America with a recorded speed of 85.7 mph 
1914 October 8, SN30 flown by Capt. H. Le R. Muller reached a record altitude of 17,441 ft 
1915 Both model J aircraft crashed in testing.

Variants
 A Model J was demonstrated with floats in 1915 at Keuka Lake
 Curtiss J-2 - A smaller design of the Model J, cancelled.
 Curtiss Model N - The first prototype was built off a Model J modified in Hammondsport, New York.

Specifications (Curtiss Model J)

See also

References

Notes

 Bowers, Peter M. Curtiss Aircraft 1907–1947. London:Putnam, 1979. .
  (Describes both the Model J and the Model N.)
 
 

Model J
1910s United States experimental aircraft
Single-engined tractor aircraft
Biplanes
Aircraft first flown in 1914